Albert Victor Aicken (29 October 1914 – 1972) was a Northern Irish professional footballer who played in the Football League for Brentford as a right half.

Career 
Aicken began his career in his native Northern Ireland with Glentoran, before joining English First Division club Brentford for a £1,000 fee prior to the beginning of the 1937–38 season. He failed to force centre half Joe James from his position and spent much of his time with the Bees in the reserve team. Aicken made three appearances for Brentford, at left and right half. The outbreak of the Second World War in August 1939 ultimately ended Aicken's professional career. He guested for Clapton Orient, West Ham United, Watford and Reading during the war, but remained with Brentford until making his final appearances during the 1942–43 season. He then returned to Northern Ireland.

Career statistics

Honours 
Glentoran

 Irish Cup: 1934–35

References

1914 births
1972 deaths
Association footballers from Belfast
Association footballers from Northern Ireland
Association football midfielders
Glentoran F.C. players
Brentford F.C. players
West Ham United F.C. wartime guest players
English Football League players
League of Ireland players
NIFL Premiership players
Watford F.C. wartime guest players

Reading F.C. wartime guest players
Clapton Orient F.C. wartime guest players